In British politics, a Whig government may refer to the following British governments administered by the Whigs:

 Whig Junto, a name given to a group of leading Whigs who were seen to direct the management of the Whig Party
First Whig Junto, the government dominated by six particular Whigs (1694–1699)
Godolphin–Marlborough ministry, the second Whig Junto government, dominated by Lord Godolphin and the Duke of Marlborough (1702–1710)
 Townshend ministry, the government dominated by Lord Townshend (1714–1717)
 First Stanhope–Sunderland ministry, the government dominated by Lord Stanhope and Lord Sunderland (1717–1718)
 Second Stanhope–Sunderland ministry, the government dominated by Lord Stanhope and Lord Sunderland (1718–1721)
 Walpole–Townshend ministry, the government dominated by Sir Robert Walpole and Lord Townshend (1721–1730)
 Walpole ministry, the government under Sir Robert Walpole (1730–1742)
 Carteret ministry, the government dominated by Lord Carteret (1742–1744)
 Broad Bottom ministry, the government under the Pelham brothers (1744–1754)
 First Newcastle ministry, the government under the Duke of Newcastle (1754–1756)
 Pitt–Devonshire ministry, the government dominated by William Pitt the Elder under the Duke of Devonshire (1756–1757)
 1757 caretaker ministry, the government under the Duke of Devonshire
 Pitt–Newcastle ministry, the government dominated by William Pitt the Elder under the Duke of Newcastle (1757–1762)
 Grenville ministry, the government under George Grenville (1763–1765)
 First Rockingham ministry, the government under Lord Rockingham (1765–1766)
 Chatham ministry, the government under Lord Chatham, better known as Pitt the Elder (1766–1768)
 Grafton ministry, the government under the Duke of Grafton (1768–1770)
 North ministry, the government under Lord North (1770–1782)
 Second Rockingham ministry, the government under Lord Rockingham (1782)
 Shelburne ministry, the government under Lord Shelburne (1782–1783)
 Fox–North coalition, the government dominated by Charles James Fox and Lord North (1783)
 Canningite government, 1827–1828, the government under George Canning (Whig) and Lord Goderich (Tory) respectively
 Whig government, 1830–1834, the government under Lord Grey and Lord Melbourne respectively
 Second Melbourne ministry, the government under Lord Melbourne (1835–1841)
 First Russell ministry, the government under Lord John Russell (1846–1852)
 First Palmerston ministry, the government under Lord Palmerston (1855–1858)

See also
 List of British governments
 Presidency of William Henry Harrison
 Presidency of John Tyler
 Presidency of Zachary Taylor
 Presidency of Millard Fillmore
 Whig history